Central Station is a light rail station in Kitchener, Ontario, Canada, which is planned to be expanded into an intermodal transit terminal. , it consists of an Ion light rail stop and Grand River Transit bus stops. The site is planned to also include a train station served by Via Rail and GO Transit, and an intercity bus terminal.

The station will replace the current Kitchener railway station and partially replace the Charles Street Terminal.

In the vicinity is the University of Waterloo's Health Sciences campus (including its School of Pharmacy), the 'One Victoria' condominium development, and the 'Kaufman Lofts' condominium (occupying the former Kaufman Footwear factory). Just north of the mainline tracks is a former industrial building, the 'Breithaupt Block', which currently houses offices of Google Canada.

Ion light rail

The light rail (LRT) station opened along with the start of LRT service in 2019, but as of 2016 there is no timeline for the construction of the remainder of the transit components. As a result, the intermodal facility will not open until 2022 at the earliest.

The LRT platforms are located on either side of King Street in Kitchener, on the north side of Victoria Street. North of the station, the LRT tracks become adjacent through the Moore/Breithaupt intersection and proceed within the median of King beyond, towards Waterloo. South of the station, the tracks split: southbound, they take Victoria to reach Charles Street, which they follow alongside; northbound, they continue along King to Francis Street, which connects them to Duke Street, which they follow alongside.

The platforms are connected with King Street's sidewalks at either end, and pedestrians passing through walk along the platform. The station's feature walls consist of glass tiles in a varying pattern of blues and greys and displays "Innovation District" under the station's name.

Intermodal terminal
After some public consultation, plans for the "King and Victoria Transit Hub" were made public in November 2020. In addition to integration with the Ion light rail system, the new train and bus station would also feature a connection to the Iron Horse Trail, one of the most-travelled cycling and walking routes in the region, as well as a pedestrian underpass connecting the north and south halves of Waterloo Street, creating more pedestrian routes in the immediate area. The planned two-storey station would have ramps and elevators to reach the railway platform level from the street level. It would also have a publicly bookable community room for local events. The construction of the new station is also listed as a project dependency in Metrolinx's March 2021 preliminary business case for two-way, all-day service on the GO Kitchener line. This is due to the need for a second station platform in order to accommodate two-way service.

As of 2021, design work on the intermodal terminal is paused due to lack of funding, the Region of Waterloo having only secured $43 million out of the project's estimated $106 million cost. However, given that the current train station is inadequate for future GO Transit train service levels, construction is proceeding on certain key elements of the terminal including the train platforms and bus terminal, to enable GO Transit service to be relocated to Kitchener Central station in Summer 2023.

On April 7, 2022, Flixbus is operating on the former Greyhound Canada bus route between the University of Waterloo and Toronto. The trips include stops at downtown Kitchener (1 Victoria Street South), Guelph Central Station and Square One Shopping Centre.

References

External links

 
 Region of Waterloo: King–Victoria Transit Hub

Via Rail stations in Ontario
Future GO Transit railway stations
Central
Central station
Bus stations in Kitchener, Ontario
2019 establishments in Ontario